Yaadon Ki Kasam is a 1985 Indian Hindi-language action film directed by Vinod Dewan, starring Mithun Chakraborty, Zeenat Aman, Shakti Kapoor, Asrani, Madan Puri and Viju Khote

Summary

Ravi Kapoor (Mithun Chakraborty) and Chandni (Zeenat Aman), a mute beautiful tribe girl, get intimate, but fate separates them. Ravi believes that she is dead. Now Ravi meets a look-alike of Chandni, liberated Geeta Khanna, in the city of Mumbai and falls in love with her. Though her character is the opposite of delicate Chandni, the marriage soon follows. One day a male child calls Geeta "mom". Who this child is forms the climax.

Cast

Mithun Chakraborty as Ravi Kapoor
Zeenat Aman as Chandni / Geeta Khanna
Shakti Kapoor
Asrani as Mirza
Madan Puri as Bishambharnath Kapoor
Sudhir Dalvi as Sardar
Ashalata Wabgaonkar as Gayatri Kapoor
Shafi Inamdar
Yunus Parvez

Soundtrack

The music for all the songs were composed by Laxmikant-Pyarelal and lyrics were penned by Anand Bakshi.

External links
 
 http://ibosnetwork.com/asp/filmbodetails.asp?id=Yaadon+Ki+Kasam 

1985 films
1980s Hindi-language films
Indian action films
Films scored by Laxmikant–Pyarelal
1985 action films
Hindi-language action films